Thracides is a Neotropical genus of grass skippers in the family Hesperiidae.

Species
Thracides arcalaus (Stoll, 1782)
Thracides cilissa Hewitson, 1867 - Brazil
Thracides cleanthes (Latreille, [1824])
T. c. cleanthes Brazil, Paraguay
T. c. binota Evans, 1955  - Venezuela
T. c. quarta Evans, 1955  - Peru
T. c. quinta Evans, 1955  - Brazil (Bahia)
T. c. telmela (Hewitson, 1866)  - Brazil (Pará)
T. c. trebla  Evans, 1955  - Bolivia
Thracides joannisii Mabille, 1904 - Panama, Ecuador.
Thracides nanea (Hewitson, 1867)
T. n. nanea - Brazil
T. n. nida Evans, 1955  - Colombia
Thracides panimeron Druce, 1908 - Bolivia
Thracides phidon (Cramer, [1779]) - Mexico, Panama to Brazil, Suriname, Trinidad
Thracides polites (Godman & Salvin, 1879) 
Thracides sacrator Godman and Salvin, 1879 
Thracides thrasea (Hewitson, 1866) - Brazil (Amazonas)

Former species
Thracides aletes Geyer, 1832 - transferred to Phanes aletes (Geyer, 1832)
Thracides seron Godman, [1901] - transferred to Daron seron (Godman, [1901])

References

External links
Natural History Museum Lepidoptera genus database
images representing Thracides at Consortium for the Barcode of Life

Hesperiinae
Hesperiidae of South America
Hesperiidae genera
Taxa named by Jacob Hübner